Krazy Kat Invalid is a silent short animated film distributed by Hearst-Vitagraph News Pictorial, and featuring Krazy Kat in one of the character's earliest animated appearances.

Plot
Krazy Kat exits a clinic, wrapped in some bandages and using a crutch. Momentarily he is greeted by a rat who knows him well. The rat asks what had happened to him. Krazy, answering in poor grammar, states he had a car accident. When the rat misinterprets his response as a locomotive accident, Krazy begins telling the story of the incident.

As Krazy explains his mishap, the scene is set several hours earlier. In it, Krazy comes out of his home, and decides to drive around in his car. After traveling only a few miles, his car runs out of fuel. Instead of stopping at a gas station, Krazy stops at a bar. And instead of filling his vehicle with gas, he fills it with beer. Bizarrely, his car is running, but in a wild uncontrollable fashion. To the cat's horror, Krazy's car is running all over the place, even going underground, and breaking through a house. The out-of-control car next heads to a railroad track where a train is approaching. The train bashes the car to pieces, and Krazy is thrown upward before landing on some power lines.

The scene returns to the present where Krazy completes his explanation. Krazy goes on to tease and call the rat "smarty mice" for the misinterpretation. The rat takes offense for the remark, and knocks out Krazy with his crutch.

Home media
The short film was also released in 2004 in a DVD video compilation called George Herriman's Kinomatic Krazy Kat Kartoon Klassics.

References

External links
Krazy Kat Invalid at the Big Cartoon Database

1916 films
American silent short films
American black-and-white films
1910s animated short films
Krazy Kat shorts
Animated films about mice
1910s American animated films
American animated short films
1916 short films
1916 animated films
Animated films about automobiles
Films about beer
Films about road accidents and incidents